American Blues was an American 1960s Texas-based rock band which played a psychedelic style of blues rock music influenced by the 13th Floor Elevators. They are most notable for including two future members of the band ZZ Top in their ranks, Dusty Hill and Frank Beard. From 1966 to 1968, they played the Dallas-Fort Worth-Houston circuit and headlined in three clubs all called "The Cellar", in Dallas at clubs such as "The Walrus" on Mockingbird Lane, and in Houston at "Love Street Light Circus Feel Good Machine" on Allen's Landing, as late as 1968.

Around 1968, the band (the two Hill brothers and Beard) decided to leave the Dallas–Fort Worth area, relocating to Houston. At this time, however, guitarist Rocky Hill wanted to focus on "straight blues", while his brother Dusty wanted the band to rock more. Rocky left the band, and the remaining two members joined the recently formed ZZ Top.

Rocky Hill continued to tour around Texas and elsewhere, becoming one of a number of guitarists well known within the state for their blues guitar prowess, such as Rocky Athis and Charlie Sexton. He sometimes referred to himself as "The Anti-Clapton", and one writer with the Houston Press called Rocky "perhaps the wildest and scariest – both onstage and off – of all the Texas white-boy blues guitarists."

Members 
Rocky Hill – guitar
Dusty Hill – bass
Richard Harris – drums
Doug Davis – piano on "Mellow"
Frank Beard – drums
Rick Steed – drums

Albums 
American Blues 'Is Here' 1968
American Blues 'Do Their Thing'  1968

References 

1960s establishments in Texas
1968 disestablishments in Texas
American blues rock musical groups
Psychedelic rock music groups from Texas
Musical groups established in the 1960s
Musical groups disestablished in 1968